Queen's Blade is an anime television series based on the visual combat books by Hobby Japan. Produced by ARMS, the anime is directed and composed by Kinji Yoshimoto, produced by Hiromasa Minami, Hirotaka Yoshida, Kazuaki Morijiri, Masaaki Yokota and Shinsaku Tanaka, characters by Rin Sin, and music by Masaru Yokoyama. The episodes' plot covers the events leading up to the Queen's Blade–a tournament of strength and beauty held every four years to decide who will be the next Queen, and the story focuses on Leina Vance, heiress to the count, travelling to Gainos to compete in the Queen's Blade tournament.

The first season of the anime, called , premiered on AT-X on April 2, 2009 and ran twelve episodes until June 18, 2009, with subsequent broadcasts on Chiba TV, Sun Television, and Tokyo MX. The show aired uncensored on AT-X, while it is heavily censored on other channels. Six DVD and Blu-ray Disc volumes were released by Media Factory between June 25 and November 25, 2009, each DVD/BD volume containing one of six OVAs called , which features the Queen's Blade fighters in a school setting. The anime is licensed in North America by Media Blasters under the English-language title Queen's Blade: The Exiled Virgin, and released three DVD volumes between May 18 and October 26, 2010. A DVD/BD box set of the series was later released on February 15, 2011.
 
A second season of the anime, called , aired on AT-X and other channels between September 24 and December 10, 2009, spanning twelve episodes as with the first season. The series, also produced by ARMS, is directed by Kinji Yoshimoto, composed by Takao Yoshioka, script by Michiko Ito, Yoshioka, Taku Satō, and Toshimitsu Takeuchi, and characters by Rin-Sin. Six DVD/BD volumes were released by Media Factory between December 22, 2009 and May 25, 2010, each containing six OVAs called , a continuation from the first six OVAs. The second season is also licensed in North America by Media Blasters under the title Queen's Blade 2: The Evil Eye, and sold two volumes (each containing six episodes) between May 24, 2011 and July 19, 2011. A Blu-ray box set was later released on September 27, 2011.

An OVA series, called , was announced on the May issue of Hobby Japan. The series takes place after the Queen's Blade tournament and serves as a prologue for Queen's Blade Rebellion, and chronicles the fighters on their separate paths. Six episodes were released on DVD and Blu-ray between August 25, 2010 and February 23, 2011.

Episodes

Queen's Blade: Wandering Warrior (JP) / Queen's Blade: The Exiled Virgin (NA) / (クイーンズブレイド 流浪の戦士, Kuīnzu Bureido: Rurō no Senshi)

Queen's Blade: Successors to the Throne (JP) / Queen's Blade 2: The Evil Eye (NA) /  (クイーンズブレイド 玉座を継ぐ者, Kuīnzu Bureido: Gyokuza o Tsugumono)

OVA Episodes

Prologue: Queen's Blade: Beautiful Fighters (JP) / Queen's Blade: Beautiful Warriors (NA) / (クイーンズブレイド ～美しき闘士たち～, Kuīnzu Bureido ~Utsukushiki Tōshi-tachi~)

Season 1 Specials: Let's Get Everyone! Great Rampage at Gynos Academy!

Season 2 Specials: Let's Show! Great Rampage at Gynos Academy!

References

External links
Official Website
Queen's Blade: The Exiled Virgin at Media Blasters

Queen's Blade
Queen's Blade